Kerry Wayne Teague (January 12, 1961 – September 11, 2021) was an American stock car racing driver. He competed in NASCAR competition in the Winston Cup Series and SuperTruck Series.

Career
Teague competed in the short-lived Sportsman Series in the early 1990s, scoring several wins, including at Charlotte Motor Speedway in 1990. That year Teague also attempted to make his debut in the Winston Cup Series, failing to qualify in three attempts; he qualified for his first race the following year, finishing 37th at Charlotte Motor Speedway in the No. 95 Sadler Brothers Racing Oldsmobile. Teague began the 1992 season driving for Team USA and Junie Donlavey, but left the team partway through the season, stating he lacked the experience to compete at the Cup level. In 1993 Teague ran his final two Cup races; he attempted events in 1994 and 1995, but failed to qualify for any of them.

In 1995 Teague began competing in the inaugural SuperTruck Series season, but in the twelfth race of the season was involved in a severe accident at Heartland Park Topeka due to a stuck throttle. Suffering head injuries in the accident, Teague ran one additional race in the series later that season at Flemington Speedway, but has not competed in NASCAR since despite fully recovering.

Motorsports career results

NASCAR
(key) (Bold - Pole position awarded by qualifying time. Italics - Pole position earned by points standings or practice time. * – Most laps led.)

Winston Cup Series

Daytona 500

Busch Series

SuperTruck Series

References

External links
 

1961 births
2021 deaths
People from Concord, North Carolina
Racing drivers from Charlotte, North Carolina
Racing drivers from North Carolina
NASCAR drivers